The Principal Triangulation of Britain was the first high-precision triangulation survey of the whole of Great Britain (including Ireland), carried out between 1791 and 1853 under the auspices of the Board of Ordnance. The aim of the survey was to establish precise geographical coordinates of almost 300 significant landmarks which could be used as the fixed points of local topographic surveys from which maps could be drawn. In addition there was a purely scientific aim in providing precise data for geodetic calculations such as the determination of the length of meridian arcs and the figure of the Earth. Such a  survey had  been proposed by William Roy (1726–1790) on his completion of the Anglo-French Survey but it was only after his death that the  Board of Ordnance initiated the trigonometric survey, motivated by military considerations in a time of a threatened French invasion. Most of the work was carried out under the direction of Isaac Dalby,  William Mudge and Thomas Frederick Colby, but the final synthesis and report (1858) was the work of Alexander Ross Clarke. The survey stood the test of time for a century, until the Retriangulation of Great Britain between 1935 and 1962.

History

In the aftermath of the Jacobite rising of 1745 it was recognised that there was a need for an accurate map of the Scottish Highlands and the necessary survey was initiated in 1747 by Lieutenant-Colonel David Watson, a Deputy Quartermaster-General of the Board of Ordnance. Watson employed William Roy as a civilian assistant to carry out the bulk of the work. Subsequently, Roy, having enlisted in the army and having become a very competent surveyor, proposed (1763) a national survey which would be a plan for defence at a time when French invasions were threatened.  The proposal was rejected on grounds of expense.

Roy continued to lobby for a survey and his ambitions were realised to a certain extent by an unexpected development. In 1783 the French Academy of Sciences claimed that the latitude and longitude differences between the  Royal Observatory, Greenwich and the Paris Observatory were incorrect, and it was proposed (to the  Royal Society) that the differences could be reconciled by high precision triangulation over the intervening terrain.  The Royal Society agreed and, jointly with the Board of Ordnance, they invited Roy to oversee the project. (Main article; Anglo-French Survey (1784–1790).)

Roy's first task (1784) was to measure a base line between Hampton Poor House and King's Arbour on Hounslow Heath, a distance of just over 5 miles (8 km). This was a painstaking process: three rods of about 20 ft. were supported on trestles and the ends aligned to an accuracy of a thousandth part of an inch. The first rod was then carried to the end of the third, an operation to be repeated 1,370 times. The final measurement gave the length of the base as 27,404.01 ft. (8,352 metres).
 
For the subsequent triangulation Roy ordered a new theodolite from leading instrument-maker Jesse Ramsden. This Ramsden theodolite, delivered in 1787, for the first time divided angular scales accurately to within a second of arc. The theodolite was the largest ever constructed but, despite its massive size, it was carried from London to the Channel coast and employed on hills, steeples and a moveable tower. At each location the angles to other vertices of the triangulation mesh were measured many times, often at night time using newly devised lights. Finally the angle data was used to calculate the sides of the triangles by using spherical trigonometry.

The final results were inconclusive, for triangulation was inferior to the precision of astronomical measurements, but the survey paved the way for all future work in terms of high precision measurements of length and angle, together with the techniques of calculating on an ellipsoidal surface. In his final report, published posthumously, Roy once again pressed for the extension of the survey to the rest of Britain. His successors would oblige. As Master of the Board of Ordnance (from 1782), Charles Lennox, 3rd Duke of Richmond, viewed Roy's work with great interest, At the same time he was acutely aware that Britain, lacking a national survey, was falling behind the standards of many other European countries. Moreover, the renewed threat of French invasion made him alarmed at  the lack of accurate maps, particularly of the southern counties. The catalyst for action was the sudden availability of a new improved Ramsden theodolite which had been intended for the East India Company. The purchase of this instrument on 21 June 1791 by the Board is taken as the inauguration of the Ordnance Survey. The very next day Richmond appointed Isaac Dalby as its first employee, with a brief to extend Roy's survey. In the following month Richmond appointed William Mudge and Edward Williams, the latter as the first superintendent of the survey.

Re-measurement of the Hounslow baseline

For the 1784 measurement of the original base-line across Hounslow Heath, Roy had ordered three deal rods cut from a new mast in the Admiralty dock yards. These were intended to be used for the precision measurement but Roy also ordered  a 100 ft steel chain from Ramsden which could be used for a quick preliminary measurement. The deal rods proved ineffective because of their changes with humidity and they were replaced with glass rods for the final measurement; however Roy observed that the chain itself was just as accurate as the rods. For this reason the 1791 survey started by remeasuring the base with two new 100 ft chains, the second to be kept unused as a reference against which any stretching of the first would be detected.

The process of measurement was exceedingly precise.   Since the ground was undulating along the length of the base, the measurement was carried out over 26 stages with varying slopes, the chains for any one stage being constrained to a perfectly straight line by many intermediate supports. These hypotenuse measurements were then projected to the horizontal. Furthermore, the temperature varied from day to day and each measurement was corrected to the length that a chain would take at 62 °F. Finally, the length of the base was reduced to its projection at sea level using the height of the south base above the Thames and the fall in the Thames down to its estuary. The final result was approximately 3 inches less than that of Roy and the mean value of 27,404.2 ft. was taken of the baseline. The difference of the two values meant that the accuracy of the measurement could be claimed to be 1 inch in 27,404 ft, which is 3 parts per million.

Corrections

As the survey proceeded westwards, Mudge decided  to check its accuracy by measuring a new baseline between two points established by the triangulation. He chose Salisbury Plain, measuring between a point near Old Sarum Castle and Beacon Hill, near Bulford, in June 1794. The difference between the distance calculated by triangulation and that established by measurement was less than one inch (over a length of more than seven miles). The result verified not only the accuracy of the triangulation, but also the measurement of the original baseline on Hounslow Heath. After remeasurement in 1849 the "Salisbury Base" (rather than the original base on Hounslow Heath) provided the baseline for subsequent triangulation.

During subsequent triangulation, errors due to atmospheric refraction, deflection of plumb-bobs, temperature, and the spherical nature of the earth (meaning there were more than 180 degrees in a triangle) were all allowed for.

See also

 Ordnance Survey
 Ordnance Survey Drawings
 Great Trigonometrical Survey

References

Bibliography
 Royal Engineers history. Royal Engineers Museum. Via Wayback machine 
biography of Roy. Royal Engineers Museum. Via wayback machine 
 Rachel Hewitt (2010), Map of a Nation, London: Granta Books.  

Lieut.-Colonel T. Pilkington White, The Ordnance Survey Of The United Kingdom, Scottish Mountaineering Club Journal Volume 2 Number 5

External links
 PDF file including history and map of the Irish part and its links to Britain
 Information and Maps on many aspects of Triangulation (& Levelling) in Great Britain

Cartography
Geography of the United Kingdom
Geographic history of the United Kingdom
1784 in Great Britain
Maps of the United Kingdom
Geodetic surveys
Surveying of the United Kingdom